Sindoora Rekha  is a 1995 Indian Malayalam-language film. It stars Suresh Gopi, Shobhana, Narendra Prasad and Ranjitha. The film has musical score by Sharreth.

Plot
Balachandran (Suresh Gopi) falls in love with Arundhathi (Shobana) and Arundathi gets pregnant when Balachandran learns that Arundathi is a patient. So, she has to give up her baby.

Cast
 
Suresh Gopi as Balachandran
Dileep as Ambujakshan
Shobhana as Arundhathi
Ranjitha as Ramani 
Narendra Prasad as Menon
Janardanan as Narayanan Nair
Oduvil Unnikrishnan as Raghavan Nair
Sankaradi as House Owner Pisharodi
Harishree Ashokan as Oommachan 
Bobby Kottarakkara as Gouthaman 
Santhosh as Dasappan
Kundara Johny as Circle Inspector 
Prathapachandran as Doctor
Aranmula Ponnamma as Muthassi
Meena as Balachandran's Mother 
Zeenath as Rajalakshmi 
Kozhikode Narayanan Nair as Vaidyar

Soundtrack
The music was composed by Sharreth.

References

External links
  
 

1995 films
1990s Malayalam-language films
Films scored by Sharreth